The IWI Galil ACE is a series of assault rifles and battle rifles originally developed and manufactured by Israel Weapon Industries (IWI). It is  produced in three different calibers: 5.56×45mm NATO, 7.62×39mm and 7.62×51mm NATO. IWI USA also produced limited edition variants of the ACE in 5.45×39mm in 2020.

The IWI Galil "ACE" series is based upon the original design of the IMI Galil, but instead utilizes a modern design to increase its accuracy and lower its weight, while maintaining the original Galil's ergonomics, ease of maintenance and reliability under battle conditions. In the design, emphasis was particularly placed on increasing the reliability and accuracy under adverse battlefield conditions.

The firearm has been adopted as a service rifle in multiple counties, such as the Chilean Army and People's Army of Vietnam. The IWI Galil ACE is also manufactured under license by Indumil, FAMAE, RPC Fort and Z111 Factory.

Design details

Weight reduction

The original Galil was built with a machined solid steel billet action in order to increase the structural integrity and survivability of the weapon.

The ACE has a significantly reduced weight. IWI redesigned the action to integrate the steel with polymer, which is much lighter than the fully steel receiver of the original Galil. While the upper receiver is machined steel and the receiver top features a MIL-STD-1913 Picatinny rail, polymer has been introduced to the lower receiver of the weapon to reduce the gun's weight.

Accuracy
According to American Rifleman: "Although this rifle is clearly based on the AK design, it demonstrated a superior level of accuracy potential compared to several of its cousins. The best single group of [5 rounds at 100 yards] of 0.83″ and five-group average of 0.98″ was produced using the Federal Premium 123-gr. [] Power-Shok soft-point load" (testing done using 7.62×39mm 16-inch barrelled variant).

Gas tube
The gas tube, unlike the AK-47 system, is mounted on the rifle via a dovetailed slide machined on the receiver upper-front block. This avoids any movement of the gas block influencing barrel vibration, which would degrade accuracy.

Long-stroke piston system
The rifle uses the Galil's long-stroke piston system. The long-stroke system is found in the M1 Garand, AK-47 (upon which the Galil's internal mechanism design borrowed heavily) and more recently in the IWI Tavor.

Barrel
The barrel is chrome-lined, cold hammer-forged, with a 1:7″ twist for 5.56×45mm NATO, 1:7.5″ for 5.45×39mm,  1:9.5″ for 7.62×39mm, and 1:12″ for 7.62×51mm NATO.

Trigger
The ACE adopts the Galil Sniper trigger instead of the original Galil trigger, in order to improve accuracy compared to the standard Galil. This is a two-stage trigger, which IWI have modelled on the two-stage trigger of the M1 Garand.

According to American Rifleman, the two-stage trigger is "clean and smooth with a 4 lb. 13 oz. [] trigger pull according to a Lyman digital trigger gauge".

Last round bolt catch
Another addition by IWI to the original Galil is the last round bolt catch (for variants of the ACE in 5.56×45mm NATO only). The bolt hold-open feature is a common request of military customers, to reduce reloading times during combat.

Sights 
The ACE has a fully adjustable iron sights with tritium front post and two dot tritium rear aperture. It also features a Picatinny rail for mounting various optical sight.

Stock

The standard buttstock found on the ACE is a six-position telescopic stock that can be fitted with an optional cheek-piece to improve the sighting of the weapon when using an optical sight. An optional right folding version of the standard buttstock is also available.

The forearm consists of MIL-STD-1913 Picatinny rails on the bottom and both sides for mounting accessories such as aiming optics. The side forearm rails have central grooves to provide routing channels for electric wiring used by pressure switch activated accessories. The forearm comes with quick detachable polymer covering panels that can be mounted to protect the rails when a side or bottom rail has no accessories mounted to it.  The gas tube above the barrel also has a Picatinny rail mounted on top that is aligned with the rail mounted on the cover over the receiver.

Variants

Military variants 
The Galil ACE is available in three different calibres with multiple barrel lengths for each type.

At some point, the ACE 52L was removed from the production line.

Civilian variants 

IWI US offers a semi-automatic only version of the Galil ACE, including all three different calibres.

In October 2020, IWI USA began production of an "extremely limited edition" 5.45×39mm variant of the Galil ACE, available with a 16-inch (40.64 cm) or 8.3 inch (21.08 cm) barrel, producing a total of 545 rifles in each size. They are compatible with AK-74 magazines.

Foreign variants

Galil Córdova

STV Rifles

Gallery

Users

 : In service with Battalion d'intervention rapide.
 
 : Selected as the Chilean Army's new 5.56 mm standard-issue rifle. In 2014, the ACE began to be deployed in the Chilean Army.
 : Manufactured by an agreement between Indumil and IWI.
 
 : 3,000 ACE 31s used by the Guatemalan Police.
 : Used by certain Haitian police officers.
 
 : Laos received Vietnamese-made Galil ACEs in January 2019.
 
 : Used by the Federal Police.
 
 : The Peruvian government has plans to produce the ACE under license, establishing a factory to produce up to 2,000 rifles per month.
 : Philippine National Police uses the ACE 22N as one of its major assault rifles as of 2018. The Philippine Drug Enforcement Agency use both the ACE-21N and ACE-22N. The Philippine Coast Guard received more than 4,000 units of ACE 21N in March 2020.
 : Used by the South Sudanese Armed Forces. Chambered in 7.62×39mm.

 : Galil ACES chambered in 7.62×39mm.
 :
 : Produced under license since August 2014 by RPC Fort; ACE 22 as the "Fort-227", ACE 31 as the "Fort-228", and ACE 52 as the "Fort-229".
 : ACE 31 and 32 have been selected as the standard-issue assault rifles in the People's Army of Vietnam (PAVN), to gradually replace their current AK-47-derived weapons. IWI has established a $100 million factory in Vietnam, to produce an unspecified number of Galil ACE assault rifles for the PAVN. All ACEs used in Vietnam have the charging handles located at the right side of the rifle and replaced the Galil ACE handguards with traditional Galil-style handguards with Picatinny rail on top, replaced standard ACE buttstock with FN-FAL Paratrooper stocks, with modifications for simpler production and ease of use, the original fire selector replaced with AK-style fire selector. The new rifle has its new designations STV-215 and STV-380, the number indicated barrel length.
 : Used by the Zambian Army.

See also
 Carbon 15
 AK-12

References

External links

 Official website
 Galil, el Israelita más Colombiano (Indumil website, in Spanish)

5.56×45mm NATO assault rifles
7.62×39mm assault rifles
7.62×51mm NATO battle rifles
Rifles of Israel
Weapons and ammunition introduced in 2008
Kalashnikov derivatives